84th Wing may refer to:

 No. 84 Wing RAAF, a unit of the United Kingdom Royal Air Force 
 84th Combat Sustainment Wing, a unit of the United States Air Force 
 84th Fighter Wing (World War II), a unit of the United States Air Force

See also
 84th Division (disambiguation)
 84th Regiment (disambiguation)
 84th Squadron (disambiguation)